Park Mi-yeong (born 1 February 1976) is a retired South Korean breaststroke swimmer. She competed in two events at the 1992 Summer Olympics.

References

External links
 

1976 births
Living people
South Korean female breaststroke swimmers
Olympic swimmers of South Korea
Swimmers at the 1992 Summer Olympics
Place of birth missing (living people)